Cappellari Glacier is a glacier  long in the Hays Mountains, flowing west from the northwest shoulder of Mount Vaughan to enter Amundsen Glacier just north of Mount Dort. It was first roughly mapped by the Byrd Antarctic Expedition, 1928–30, and remapped by the United States Geological Survey from ground surveys and from U.S. Navy air photos, 1960–64. It was named by the Advisory Committee on Antarctic Names for Lewis K. Cappellari who made ionospheric studies at McMurdo Station in 1965.

References 

Glaciers of Amundsen Coast